The Kalmar Strait is a strait in the Baltic Sea, located between the Swedish island of Öland and the province of Småland of the Swedish mainland.

There is a road bridge across the strait, the Öland Bridge, opened in September 1972.

Prehistory
The areas along the Kalmar Strait have a heritage of Neolithic and Bronze Age habitation; moreover, Mesolithic peoples crossed the strait on an ice bridge in the early Holocene period as glaciers began to recede from Öland.  A place where early Mesolithic settlement of the island of Öland occurred is Alby, whose people migrated across the Kalmar Strait approximately 6000 BC, and established one of the oldest known Mesolithic villages in Northern Europe.

References

Straits of Sweden
Straits of the Baltic Sea
Landforms of Kalmar County
Öland
Småland